Kostana may refer to:
 Koštana, a Serbian play
 Milea (Thesprotia), Greece, formerly called Kostana